The 1993 FIVB Volleyball World League was the fourth edition of the annual men's international volleyball tournament, played by 12 countries from 21 May to 31 July 1993. The Final Round was held in São Paulo, Brazil.

Pools composition

Intercontinental round

Pool A

|}

|}

Pool B

|}

|}

Final round
Venue:  Ginásio do Ibirapuera, São Paulo, Brazil

Semifinals

|}

3rd place match

|}

Final

|}

Final standing

Awards
Most Valuable Player
  Giovane Gávio

Best Spiker
  Dmitriy Fomin

Best Setter
  Mauricio Lima

Best Blocker
  Oleg Shatunov

Best Server
  Dmitriy Fomin

Best Receiver
  Gilmar Teixeira

Best Digger
  Damiano Pippi

External links

1993 World League Results
1993 World League results 
Sports123

FIVB Volleyball World League
FIVB World League
Volleyball
Volleyball